Ikram is a unisex given name and surname.

Surname
Aamir Ikram (born 1960), Pakistani cricketer
Muhammed Ikram (born 1988), Pakistani footballer
Nassar Ikram SI(M), an active two-star ranked Pakistan's Naval official
S. M. Ikram (1908–1973), Pakistani historian
Salima Ikram (born 1965), professor of Egyptology at the American University in Cairo
Tan Ikram, district judge
Zied Ayet Ikram (born 1988), amateur Tunisian Greco-Roman wrestler

Given name
Ikram Akhtar (born 1970), Indian film writer
Ikram Antaki (1948–2000), female Syrian-Mexican writer
Ikrom Berdiev, Uzbekistani boxer
Ikram Butt (born 1968), English professional rugby league footballer
Ikram Dinçer (born 1959), Turkish politician
Ikram Elahi (born 1933), former Pakistani cricketer
Ikram Khan, Indian sarangi player
Ikram Rabbani, former Pakistani cricket umpire
Ikram Kerwat, Tunisian-German boxer
Ikram Sehgal, defense analyst and security expert
Ikram Yakubov, former intelligence officer of Uzbekistan

Similar name
Iqram Dinzly (born 1981), a Malaysian actor, model and television host

See also
Ikramullah (disambiguation)

Arabic unisex given names